Ditfurt is a municipality in the district of Harz, Saxony-Anhalt, Germany.

Sites of interest
Ditfurt's history museum has crafts and information about the history of the village, it also displays the artifacts from the village's agricultural past.

References